The National Football League playoffs for the 2003 season began on January 3, 2004. The postseason tournament concluded with the New England Patriots defeating the Carolina Panthers in Super Bowl XXXVIII, 32–29, on February 1, at Reliant Stadium in Houston, Texas.

Beginning with the 2003–04 season, the NFL changed the selection procedures regarding officials for playoff games. The league suspended the prior practice of assembling "all-star" officiating crews of highly rated individual officials. Instead, the league began using the entire crews that were highest rated during the regular season, preserving familiarity and cohesiveness in the officiating. The "all-star" crews were later resumed, beginning with the 2005–06 Conference Championships.

Participants

Bracket

Schedule

In the United States, ABC broadcast the first two Wild Card playoff games. Fox then televised the rest of the NFC games. CBS broadcast the rest of the AFC playoff games and Super Bowl XXXVIII.

Wild Card playoffs

Saturday, January 3, 2004

AFC: Tennessee Titans 20, Baltimore Ravens 17

In a defensive struggle, Gary Anderson kicked the winning 46-yard field goal for the Titans with 29 seconds left. The winning kick was set up after a 15-yard unnecessary roughness penalty on Ravens offensive tackle Orlando Brown Sr. forced Baltimore to punt and enabled Tennessee to start its final drive from its own 37-yard line. Titans quarterback Steve McNair threw three interceptions. Meanwhile, the Ravens running back Jamal Lewis, the league's regular season rushing leader, was limited to 35 yards on 14 carries.

On the Titans opening drive of the game, McNair completed passes to Drew Bennett and Frank Wycheck for gains of 17 and 14 yards, while Eddie George rushed five times for 25 yards on a 10-play, 67-yard drive. Running back Chris Brown finished the drive with a 6-yard touchdown run to give Tennessee a 7–0 lead. The Ravens were forced to punt on their ensuing drive, but three plays later, safety Ed Reed tipped a pass from McNair into the arms of cornerback Will Demps, who returned it 56 yards for a touchdown.

Early in the second quarter, a 15-yard punt return from Titans receiver Derrick Mason gave his team the ball at the Ravens 35-yard line. McNair then led them to the 17-yard line, but Reed intercepted a pass from him and returned it 23 yards to the 29. After an exchange of punts, Ravens quarterback Anthony Wright completed four passes for 56 yards and rushed for 11, setting up a 43-yard field goal by Matt Stover giving Baltimore a 10–7 halftime lead.

Midway through the third quarter, McNair's 49-yard touchdown pass to Justin McCareins gave the Titans a 14–10 lead. Then in the fourth quarter, Tennessee cornerback Samari Rolle intercepted a pass from Wright at the Ravens 30-yard line, setting up a 45-yard field goal from Anderson. But Wright led Baltimore back, completing five passes for 80 yards on their ensuing drive. Tight end Todd Heap caught three of Wright's passes for 55 yards, and finished the drive with a leaping 35-yard catch in the back of the end zone to tie the game.

After an exchange of punts, the Titans took the ball on their own 37-yard line and drove 35 yards to Ravens 28-yard line where Anderson's 46-yard field goal with 33 seconds left gave them the win. This would be the Titans last playoff win until 2017.

This was the second postseason meeting between the Titans and Ravens. Baltimore won the only previous meeting.

NFC: Carolina Panthers 29, Dallas Cowboys 10

The Cowboys' turnaround season under coach Bill Parcells came to a crashing halt. The Panthers outgained the Cowboys in total yards 380–204 and held the ball for 34:23. Dallas quarterback Quincy Carter threw for only 154 yards and an interception, while being sacked three times. Meanwhile, Panthers quarterback Jake Delhomme threw for 273 yards and a touchdown to Steve Smith, who had five receptions for 135 yards and added 22 return yards on special teams. Stephen Davis ran for 104 yards and another touchdown, while Muhsin Muhammad caught four passes for 103 yards. John Kasay kicked five field goals for Carolina.

On the Panthers third play of the game, Delhomme completed a 70-yard pass to Smith on the Cowboys 1-yard line, setting up Kasay's first field goal. Later in the first quarter, Toby Gowin's 31-yard punt gave the Panthers the ball at the Cowboys 41-yard line, and they scored another field goal to take a 6–0 lead. On the Cowboys ensuing drive, Carter completed a 28-yard pass to Joey Galloway and Troy Hambrick ran for 16 yards, giving Dallas a first down at the Panthers 20-yard line. But two plays later, fullback Richie Anderson fumbled the ball and Carolina safety Mike Minter recovered it.

Later in the second quarter, Gowin once again gave the Panthers great field position with a 17-yard punt to the Carolina 49-yard line, and this time they managed to get the ball into the end zone with a 23-yard touchdown run by Davis, giving them a 13–0 lead. Carter managed to respond on the Cowboys ensuing drive, completing an 18-yard pass to Galloway, a 21-yard pass to Terry Glenn, and a 12-yard pass to Anderson. Billy Cundiff finished the drive with a 37-yard field goal to cut the score to 13–3 with 1:03 left in the second quarter. But after the ensuing kickoff, Delhomme's 57-yard completion to Muhammad set up Kasay's third field goal on the last play of the half.

The Panthers continued to dominate the game in the second half. Smith returned a Gowin punt seven yards to the Panthers 37-yard line. Then after a 24-yard reception by Muhammad, he caught a 7-yard pass and capped the drive with a 32-yard touchdown catch. Later on, he returned a punt to his own 40-yard line, setting up a 38-yard drive that ended with Kasay's fourth field goal, increasing the Panthers lead to 26–3.

Dallas receiver Michael Bates returned the ensuing kickoff 41 yards to the Panthers 47-yard line, sparking a desperate rally. Carter then completed six consecutive passes and finished the drive with a 9-yard touchdown run, cutting the score to 26–10. Dallas' defense managed to force a punt on Carolina's next drive, but two plays later, Panthers lineman Julius Peppers intercepted a screen pass from Carter and returned it 34 yards to the Cowboys 11-yard line. Four plays later, Kasay kicked his fifth field goal with 3:04 left in the game to close out the scoring.

This was the second postseason meeting between the Cowboys and Panthers. Carolina won the only previous meeting.

Sunday, January 4, 2004

NFC: Green Bay Packers 33, Seattle Seahawks 27 (OT)

Packers cornerback Al Harris returned an interception 52 yards for the game-winning touchdown 4:25 into overtime, making this the first playoff game ever to be won in overtime with a defensive touchdown. The game is memorable for Seahawks quarterback Matt Hasselbeck's ironic comment after winning the coin toss for the start of overtime, telling the microphoned referee, and thus the crowd at Lambeau Field and the national television audience, "We want the ball, and we're going to score."

After forcing a punt, the Seahawks scored on their opening drive, with Hasselbeck completing two passes to Koren Robinson for 25 yards and Shaun Alexander rushing for 22 on the way to a 30-yard field goal by Josh Brown. In the second quarter, Tom Rouen's 38-yard punt gave the Packers the ball at midfield. Green Bay quarterback Brett Favre then completed a 29-yard pass to fullback William Henderson to set up a 31-yard field goal from Ryan Longwell. Seattle struck back with a 51-yard drive, featuring a 28-yard reception by Bobby Engram, and scored another Brown field goal to retake the lead. But on the first play of the Packers ensuing drive, Favre completed a 44-yard pass to Javon Walker. Then after a 13-yard run from Ahman Green, Favre threw a 23-yard touchdown pass to tight end Bubba Franks. Seattle was forced to punt from their own 7 on their next drive, and receiver Antonio Chatman returned the ball six yards to the Seahawks 39-yard line. Two plays later, Favre's 23-yard completion to Donald Driver set up Longwell's 27-yard field goal with 41 seconds left in the half, giving the Packers a 13–6 lead.

Seattle took the second half kickoff and stormed down the field, driving 74 yards in 10 plays. Hasselbeck started out the drive with a 25-yard pass to Darrell Jackson, followed it up with a 15-yard completion to Itula Mili, and later completed a 14-yard pass to Mili. Alexander finished the drive with a 1-yard touchdown run on fourth down to tie the game. Then after forcing a punt, Hasselbeck completed five of seven passes for 72 yards, including a 33-yard pass to Robinson, and Alexander scored with another 1-yard touchdown run to give his team a 20–13 lead. Green Bay fullback Nick Luchey returned the ensuing kickoff 12 yards to his own 40-yard line, and Favre subsequently led the Packers 60 yards in 11 plays, taking over seven minutes off the clock. At the end of the drive, Green's 1-yard touchdown run tied the game with 9:56 left in the fourth quarter.

Seattle went three-and-out on their next drive, and Chatman returned Rouen's punt 21 yards to the Seahawks 49-yard line. Favre once again led the Packers on another long scoring drive, moving the ball 49 yards in 12 plays and consuming 6:51 off the clock. Green finished the drive with another 1-yard touchdown run, and Longwell's extra point gave the Packers a 27–20 lead with 2:39 left in regulation. But Hasslbeck responded by completing three of five passes for 59 yards, including a 34-yard pass to Engram, on the way to Alexander's third 1-yard touchdown run to tie the game. Favre's 27-yard completion to Walker on the Packers ensuing drive gave them a chance to win, but Longwell missed a 47-yard field goal attempt on the last play of regulation, and it went into overtime.

After the Seahawks won the overtime coin flip, Hasselbeck inadvertently spoke into the referee's microphone, "We want the ball and we're gonna score!" After both teams went three-and-out on their first drives of the extra period, Seattle drove to their own 45-yard line before Harris intercepted Hasselbeck's pass and returned it 52 yards for the winning touchdown.

Favre completed 26 of 38 passes for 319 yards (his second highest post season total) and a touchdown. This was his 14th consecutive postseason game with a touchdown pass, a postseason record. Walker caught five passes for 111 yards. This would be the final game for John Randle in his Hall of Fame career.

This was the first postseason meeting between the Seahawks and Packers.

AFC: Indianapolis Colts 41, Denver Broncos 10

Colts quarterback Peyton Manning earned his first playoff victory as he completed 22 of 26 passes for 377 yards and five touchdowns, giving him a perfect passer rating of 158.3 as the Colts crushed the Broncos, scoring on every possession until running back Edgerrin James lost a fumble with 14:14 left in the fourth quarter. Manning passed for four touchdowns in the first half alone, including one to Marvin Harrison where he got up and scored after falling down untouched. Both Harrison and Brandon Stokley scored two touchdowns for Indianapolis, with Reggie Wayne added the fifth. Meanwhile, the Colts defense picked off two passes from Broncos quarterback Jake Plummer and recovered a fumble. Harrison recorded a career postseason high seven receptions for 133 yards and two touchdowns, while Stokley caught four passes for 144 yards and two scores.

The Colts took the opening kickoff and stormed down the field. James gained 39 yards on the first five plays of the drive, and then Manning finished it with a 31-yard touchdown pass to Stokley. Denver responded on their ensuing drive, advancing the ball 49 yards in 12 plays and taking 8:13 off the clock. Jason Elam capped off the drive with a 49-yard field goal to cut their deficit to 7–3, but it was as close as Denver would ever get for the rest of the game. After the kickoff, Harrison caught three passes for 70 yards, including a pass in which he made a diving catch around three Denver players. All of them thought Harrison was down by contact and started to leave the field, but no one had actually touched him, and Harrison got back up and ran 46 yards for a touchdown.

After forcing a punt, the Colts drove 80 yards in nine plays. James rushed for 17 yards on the drive, while Manning started it off with a 25-yard completion to tight end Marcus Pollard and finished it with a 23-yard touchdown pass to Harrison, giving the Colts a 21–3 lead with 11:07 left in the second quarter. Denver managed to move the ball to the Colts 36-yard line on their ensuing drive, but a 15-yard penalty on guard Dan Neil pushed them out of field goal range and forced them to punt. Micah Knorr managed to pin Indianapolis back at their own 13-yard line with his punt, but on the first play after that, Manning threw an 87-yard touchdown pass to Stokley. Plummer's 18-yard completion to Rod Smith helped the Broncos advance to the Indianapolis 37-yard line on Denver's next possession, but then he threw an interception to cornerback David Macklin, who returned it 21 yards to the Colts 45-yard line. After the turnover, Manning completed four passes for 48 yards, moving the ball to the Broncos 10-yard line where Mike Vanderjagt made a 27-yard field goal on the last play of the half, giving the Colts a 31–3 halftime lead.

The Colts defense stepped up in the third quarter, forcing three turnovers. Denver took the second half kickoff and drove to the Colts 23-yard line, featuring a 34-yard reception by Smith. But then Plummer was sacked on third down and Elam's 46-yard field goal attempt was blocked. After the botched field goal, the Colts drove 64 yards and scored with Manning's fifth touchdown pass, a 7-yard toss to Wayne. Three plays after the ensuing kickoff, Colts linebacker Rob Morris recovered a fumble from Plummer on the Broncos 20-yard line, setting up a 20-yard field goal from Vanderjagt. Then four plays after the ensuing kickoff, Macklin recorded his second interception from Plummer and returned it 32 yards to the Broncos 49-yard line.

This time, the Colts were unable to get any points. Three plays after the interception, Broncos linebacker Reggie Hayward recovered a fumble from James on the Broncos 38-yard line. After that, the Broncos drove 62 yards in 12 plays and scored with Plummer's 7-yard touchdown pass to Smith, cutting their deficit to 41–10. But by then, there was only seven minutes left in the game.

This was the first postseason meeting between the Broncos and Colts.

Divisional playoffs

Saturday, January 10, 2004

NFC: Carolina Panthers 29, St. Louis Rams 23 (2OT)

The Panthers stunned the favored Rams in double-overtime, the fifth longest game in NFL history, in a thrilling finish to a game that featured big swings in momentum.

St. Louis scored on their first drive of the game, with Marc Bulger completing passes to Dane Looker and Isaac Bruce for gains of 24 and 17 yards on the way to a 20-yard Jeff Wilkins field goal. They went on to add another field goal on their first drive of the second quarter, set up by Tommy Polley's 37-yard interception return to the Panthers 22-yard line. On the first play after the ensuing kickoff, Carolina managed to take the momentum with a 65-yard run by Stephen Davis, giving them a first down on the Rams 4. Eventually faced with third and goal from the 5, quarterback Jake Delhomme was tackled behind the line and fumbled the ball while attempting a shovel pass, but it rolled into the end zone where receiver Muhsin Muhammad recovered it for a touchdown that gave the Panthers a 7–6 lead. The Rams got the ball back on their own 46 due to a 15-yard face mask penalty by Mike Minter while tackling Arlen Harris at the end of a 30-yard return, and retook the lead with a third field goal from Wilkins. However, the Panthers also received good field position to start their next series, as Brad Hoover returned the next kickoff 19 yards to the Carolina 41. Delhomme then led the Panthers to the St. Louis 27 where John Kasay kicked a 45-yard field goal, giving the team a 10–9 lead at the end of the half.

For the third time in three quarters, St. Louis scored a field goal on their first drive, this one a franchise playoff record 51-yard kick from Wilkins that was set up by Bruce's 24-yard reception. However, the Panthers stormed back with three unanswered scoring drives. Kasay soon responded with a franchise playoff record field goal of his own, this one from 52 yards, to retake the Panthers lead at 13–12. Following a Rams punt, Carolina drove 64 yards in 14 plays and scored again on Kasay's 34-yard kick. Then in the fourth quarter, Minter intercepted a pass from Bulger on the Panthers 27. Carolina subsequently drove 73 yards, including a 36-yard catch by Steve Smith, to score on Hoover's 7-yard touchdown run and increase their lead to 23–12.

Carolina now seemed to be in control of the game, especially when Deon Grant intercepted Bulger's pass on the first play after the ensuing kickoff and returned it 16 yards to the Rams 28. But the Panthers went three and out, and on their third down play, defensive tackle Tyoka Jackson's 11-yard sack pushed them to the outer limits of field goal range, where Kasay missed a 53-yard kick attempt with 6:26 left in regulation.

St. Louis took the ball back and drove 57 yards in 15 plays, featuring a 22-yard reception by Marshall Faulk on fourth down and two, and scored with Faulk's 1-yard touchdown run. Bulger's subsequent 2-point conversion pass to Looker cut the score to 23–20 with 2:39 to go. Then Wilkins recovered his own onside kick, setting up a 43-yard drive that ended with his 33-yard field goal. The field goal would cause some controversy, as the Rams held the ball inside the Carolina 20-yard line with less than a minute remaining, and one timeout. But Rams coach Mike Martz elected to play for the tie, allowing the clock to run down and kick the tying field goal, rather than let his quick-scoring offense try for the winning touchdown. Wilkins sent the game into overtime when he booted his fifth field goal of the afternoon through the uprights to tie the score at 23 as time expired in regulation.

Both teams blew scoring chances in the first overtime period. The Panthers would march down to the Rams 22-yard line on their first drive in overtime, and Kasay made a 40-yard field goal that would have won the game. But the Panthers were flagged for delay of game, and Kasay's second attempt from 45 yards was wide right. On the Rams ensuing possession, Wilkins attempted a 53-yard field goal, but it fell short. On the first play after Wilkins' miss, Muhammad caught a 22-yard pass on the Rams 35. But two sacks and a false start penalty pushed the Panthers all the way back to their own side of the field and they ended up punting the ball away.

The Rams took the ball back and drove into Carolina territory, however an errant Bulger pass was intercepted by Carolina cornerback Ricky Manning. On the first play of the second overtime period, Delhomme needed only ten seconds to throw a 69-yard touchdown pass to Smith to win the game. It marked the first double-overtime game and longest NFL game since the 1986 playoffs.

Delhomme completed 16 of 26 passes for 290 yards, a touchdown, and an interception. Smith caught six passes for 163 yards and a touchdown. Bulger threw for 332 yards, but was intercepted three times. Bruce caught seven passes for 116 yards. Panthers kick returner Rod Smart returned five kickoffs for 123 yards, while Harris returned five for 124. Rams defensive end Brian Young had two sacks.

This turned out to be the last hurrah for The Greatest Show on Turf, as the Rams would head into a steady decline over the next several seasons. It was also the last playoff game for the Rams in St. Louis before returning to Los Angeles in 2016 and their last home playoff game overall until 2017.

This was the first postseason meeting between the Panthers and Rams.

AFC: New England Patriots 17, Tennessee Titans 14

In one of the coldest games in NFL history, with temperatures reaching , the Patriots survived the cold and NFL co-MVP Steve McNair, relying on yet another game-winning field goal from kicker Adam Vinatieri late in the fourth quarter and a key defensive stand.

Tom Brady stormed out the gates with a 19-yard completion to Kevin Faulk with his first pass attempt. A few plays later, the Titans defensive scheme confused him and caused him to burn a timeout, but it was well spent. On the next play, he threw a 41-yard touchdown pass to Bethel Johnson. McNair struck back with a 15-yard completion to Derrick Mason and a 24-yard pass to running back Eddie George, moving the ball to the Patriots 22-yard line. Roman Phifer almost ended the drive by intercepting a pass from McNair, but defensive end Richard Seymour was penalized for roughing the passer and the Titans got the ball back with a first down on the New England 9-yard line. Two plays later, Chris Brown scored a 5-yard touchdown run to tie the game.

After the ensuing kickoff, Brady completed a pass to Dedric Ward for 22 yards on a 38-yard drive to the Titans 26-yard line. The drive ended with no points when Vinatieri missed a 44-yard field goal attempt, but on the next play, safety Rodney Harrison intercepted a pass from McNair and returned it seven yards to the Patriots 43-yard line. Brady subsequently completed four of six passes for 49 yards and rushed for three on the way to a 1-yard touchdown run by Antowain Smith to retake the lead less than two minutes into the second quarter. Later in the quarter, the Titans drove 51 yards in nine plays to the Patriots 13-yard line, featuring a 29-yard completion from McNair to Mason. But New England's defense kept them out the end zone and blocked Gary Anderson's 31-yard field goal attempt.

Early in the third quarter, McNair led the Titans on a 70-yard scoring drive, completing five consecutive passes for 59 yards and capping it off with an 11-yard touchdown pass to Mason. The rest of the third quarter was scoreless, but midway through the fourth quarter, Troy Brown's 10-yard punt return gave the Patriots great field position at the Titans 40-yard line. The Patriots gained only 13 yards on their ensuing possession (including a critical 4-yard completion from Brady to Brown on fourth down and 3), but it was enough for Vinatieri to make a 46-yard field goal, giving New England a 17–14 lead with 4:02 left in regulation.

The Titans took the ensuing kickoff and drove to the Patriots 33-yard line. But two penalties, a 10-yard intentional grounding call and a holding penalty, pushed them back 20 yards. McNair threw an 11-yard completion on the next play, but after that, Drew Bennett had the ball knocked out of his hands on fourth down and 12, and the Titans turned the ball over on downs with 1:38 left.

This was the second postseason meeting between the Titans and Patriots. The Titans won the only prior meeting as the Houston Oilers.

Sunday, January 11, 2004

AFC: Indianapolis Colts 38, Kansas City Chiefs 31

This offensive shootout became the second puntless game in NFL playoff history. For the second game in a row, Colts punter Hunter Smith took the day off while quarterback Peyton Manning completed 22 of 30 passes for 304 yards and three touchdowns (to Reggie Wayne, Brandon Stokley and Tom Lopienski respectively), while Edgerrin James ran for a career postseason high 125 yards and two scores. On the Kansas City side, Dante Hall caught a touchdown and returned seven kickoffs for 207 yards and another score, and Priest Holmes, who set the regular-season rushing touchdown record in 2003, rushed for 176 yards, caught five passes for 32 yards, and scored twice. Kansas City's 33-year-old quarterback Trent Green threw for 212 yards and a touchdown while also rushing for 18 yards in his first career postseason game. A touchdown pass called back by a penalty and Holmes' third-quarter fumble, which set up a Colts' field goal, turned out to be too much for the Chiefs to overcome. Kansas City defensive coordinator Greg Robinson resigned the following week in disgrace. "He is the master," Kansas City defensive end Eric Hicks said of Manning. "That was an amazing performance. I never would have thought a quarterback would play two games in a row like that. They took us behind the woodshed and just beat us. It was embarrassing."

Manning started off the day leading the Colts 70 yards and finished the opening drive with a 29-yard touchdown pass to Stokley. Kansas City responded with a 73-yard drive, with Holmes gaining 44 yards on five carries before Morten Andersen kicked a 22-yard field goal to cut the score to 7–3. The Colts stormed right back, driving 76 yards in six plays. Manning completed a 38-yard pass to Marvin Harrison on the drive, and James finished it with an 11-yard touchdown run. But then Kansas City came back, driving 77 yards in 12 plays, converting three third downs, and finishing the drive with a 9-yard touchdown pass from Green to Hall in the second quarter.

After that, Manning led the Colts 71 yards and scored with a 2-yard touchdown pass to Tom Lopienski, giving them a 21–10 lead. Once again, the Chiefs drove deep into Colts territory, but this time they failed to score. First, Tony Gonzalez's 27-yard touchdown catch was called back by a pass interference penalty, and then Andersen missed a 31-yard field goal attempt.

The end of the first half briefly interrupted the barrage of scoring, but it quickly resumed in the second. On the second play of the half, Holmes' 48-yard run moved the ball to the Colts 22-yard line. But on the next play, Indianapolis cornerback David Macklin stripped the ball from Holmes and recovered it. After that, the Colts drove to the Chiefs 22-yard line before Kansas City's first key defensive play of the game, defensive tackle Shawn Barber tackling James for a 5-yard loss on third down, forced them to settle for a Mike Vanderjagt field goal, increasing their lead to 24–10. But the Chiefs were not about to go down. Hall returned the ensuing kickoff 26 yards to his own 44-yard line. Then Holmes made up for his earlier mistake by carrying the ball on six of the eight plays of Kansas City's possession, gaining 44 yards and finishing the drive with a 1-yard touchdown run. Not to be outdone, Manning responded with five consecutive completions for 57 yards, including a 19-yard touchdown pass to Wayne to put the Colts back up by 14 points. But this margin turned out to be short lived; Hall returned the ensuing kickoff 92 yards for a touchdown.

But once again, the Chiefs defense had no ability to stop the Colts. Manning led them on a 10-play, 81-yard drive that ended with James' 1-yard touchdown run with 10:38 left in the game. The Chiefs responded with a touchdown of their own, but it took too long. By the time Holmes finished the 17-play, 76-yard drive with a 1-yard touchdown run, only 4:16 remained in the game. The Colts then put the game away by running the clock down to eight seconds on their ensuing drive. This game is known among Chiefs fans in the pantheon of great Chief playoff losses as "The No Punt Game".

This was the second postseason meeting between the Colts and Chiefs. Indianapolis won the only prior meeting.

NFC: Philadelphia Eagles 20, Green Bay Packers 17 (OT)

Ahman Green's franchise postseason record 156 rushing yards and an early 14–0 lead was not enough to lift the Packers to victory. Facing fourth down and 26 yards to go, with 1:12 left in the fourth quarter and the Packers leading 17–14, Eagles quarterback Donovan McNabb completed a 28-yard pass to Freddie Mitchell on a famous play now known as "4th and 26". The play set up David Akers' 37-yard field goal to send the game into overtime. In the extra period, an interception by Brian Dawkins set up another Akers field goal to win the game.

Midway through the first quarter, Packers lineman Nick Barnett recovered a fumble from McNabb on the Eagles 40-yard line, and Brett Favre threw a 40-yard touchdown pass to Robert Ferguson on the next play. James Thrash returned the ensuing kickoff 36 yards to the 44-yard line. Then McNabb made up for his mistake with a 41-yard run to the Packers 15. But the drive stalled at the 14-yard line and ended with no points when Akers missed a 31-yard field goal attempt. After the missed field goal, Green rushed three times for 31 yards before Favre threw his second touchdown pass to Ferguson, giving the Packers a 14–0 lead with 1:16 left in the first quarter.

In the second quarter, McNabb led the Eagles on a scoring drive, completing five consecutive passes for 77 yards, including a 45-yard pass to Todd Pinkston. On the last play, his 7-yard touchdown pass to Duce Staley cut the deficit to 14–7. Green Bay took the kickoff and drove 67 yards to the Eagles 1-yard line, featuring a 33-yard run by Green, but on fourth down, Green was stuffed by linemen Jerome McDougle and Mark Simoneau for no gain and the Packers turned the ball over on downs.

Late in the third quarter, the Eagles drove 88 yards in eight plays to tie the game, despite two 10-yard penalties against them on the drive. McNabb was responsible for all of the yards on the drive, rushing for 37 yards and completing four passes for 72, including a 12-yard touchdown pass to Pinkston that tied the game on the first play of the fourth quarter.

Later on, Antonio Chatman's 10-yard punt return gave the Packers great field position on their own 49-yard line. On the next play, Favre threw a 44-yard completion to Javon Walker. Philadelphia's defense kept Green Bay out of the end zone, but Ryan Longwell kicked a 21-yard field goal to give them a 17–14 lead. After an exchange of punts, the Eagles got the ball on their own 20-yard line with 2:22 left in regulation.

Staley started out the drive with a 22-yard run. Over the next three plays, McNabb was sacked for a 16-yard loss and threw two incompletions, bringing up 4th and 26 to go with just 1:16 left in the game. But he managed to overcome the situation with a 28-yard completion to Mitchell to keep the drive alive. He then added a 3-yard run, a 9-yard pass to Mitchell, and a 10-yard completion to Pinkston to get his team into field goal range, where Akers' 37-yard field goal sent the game into overtime.

Philadelphia won the coin toss in overtime, but they were forced to punt after three plays and Chatman returned the ball 15 yards to the 42-yard line. However, Dawkins intercepted Favre's first pass of the ensuing drive and returned it 35 yards to the Packers 34-yard line. An 11-yard run by Staley and an 8-yard reception by Pinkston then set up a 31-yard field goal from Akers to win the game.

Although he was sacked eight times and lost a fumble, McNabb had a solid performance in the game, completing 21 of 39 passes for 248 yards and two touchdowns, while also rushing for 107 yards on 11 carries. His 107 rushing yards were a postseason record for a quarterback. Pinkston caught seven passes for 95 yards and a touchdown, while Thrash returned five kickoffs for 125 yards.

This was the second postseason meeting between the Packers and Eagles. Philadelphia won the only prior meeting.

Conference Championships

Sunday, January 18, 2004

AFC: New England Patriots 24, Indianapolis Colts 14

New England's defense dominated the Colts, only allowing 14 points, intercepting four passes from Peyton Manning (3 of them by Ty Law), recording four sacks (three by Jarvis Green), and forcing a safety. Although New England's offense fared no better and only scored one touchdown, Vinatieri's five field goals made up for the difference as the Patriots won, 24–14, to advance to their second Super Bowl appearance in three seasons.

The Patriots took the opening kickoff and scored on their first drive, advancing the ball 65 yards in 13 plays. Tom Brady completed four passes to receiver David Givens for 40 yards on the drive, including a 7-yard touchdown pass, and converted a fourth down on his own 44-yard line with a 2-yard run. Manning seemed ready to counter, driving the Colts 68 yards to the New England 5-yard line, but on third down and 3, his pass was intercepted by Rodney Harrison in the end zone. After the interception, the Patriots drove 67 yards to the Colts 13-yard line where Vinatieri's 31-yard field goal increased their lead to 10–0.

The Patriots defense continued to dominate the Colts in the second quarter. On the first play after the ensuing kickoff, Law intercepted a pass from Manning and returned it six yards to the 41-yard line. The Patriots then drove 52 yards and increased their lead to 13–0 with a second Vinatieri field goal. Brady completed three passes for 42 yards on the drive, including a 17-yarder to Givens and a 16-yard completion to Troy Brown on fourth down and 8. For the first time in the entire postseason, the Colts were forced to punt on their next drive. Apparently, they were very out of practice, because the snap from center Justin Snow sailed over the head of punter Hunter Smith. The ball went into the end zone, and Smith was forced to knock it out of bounds for a safety, making the score 15–0.

The Colts had a great opportunity to score when cornerback David Macklin recovered a fumble from receiver Bethel Johnson three plays after the free kick, giving Indianapolis a first down on the Patriots 41-yard line. But five plays later, Harrison forced a fumble while tackling Marvin Harrison, and cornerback Tyrone Poole recovered it.

Trailing 15–0 at halftime, the Colts finally managed to build some momentum in the third quarter. First, Dominic Rhodes gave them great field position by returning the second half kickoff 35 yards to the 49-yard line. Then running back Edgerrin James spearheaded a 52-yard scoring drive, carrying the ball on seven of 12 plays for 32 yards and capping it off with a 2-yard touchdown run to cut the score to 15–7. But the Patriots took over the rest of the quarter. After Patrick Pass returned the ensuing kickoff 21 yards to the 43-yard line, Brady completed passes to Larry Centers for 28 yards, Brown for 17, and Kevin Faulk for 8, setting up Vinatieri's third field goal to increase their lead to 18–7. Three plays after the ensuing kickoff, Indianapolis was forced to punt. Antowain Smith then rushed four times for 53 yards on New England's next possession, advancing the ball to the Colts 3-yard line where Vinatieri kicked his fourth field goal. Two plays after the ensuing kickoff, Law recorded his second interception from Manning on the Colts 31-yard line. But this time, the Patriots failed to score because cornerback Walt Harris picked off a pass from Brady in the end zone.

After the turnover, the Colts drove 57 yards to the New England 31-yard line. But then Manning threw his third interception to Law with 8:17 left in the fourth quarter. After forcing a punt, Manning led the Colts back, completing eight of nine passes for 64 yards and finishing the drive with a 7-yard touchdown pass to Marcus Pollard with 2:22 left in regulation. The Colts failed to recover their ensuing onside kick attempt, but forced a punt with 2:01 left. However, the Patriots defense limited Manning to four consecutive incompletions, causing the Colts to turn the ball over on downs. Then after making Indianapolis use up all of their timeouts, Vinatieri's fifth field goal increased the Patriots lead to 24–14. The Colts attempted one last desperation drive, but ended up turning the ball over on downs again with seven seconds left in the game.

Brady completed 22 of 37 passes for 237 yards, a touchdown, and an interception. Smith rushed for 100 yards. Pollard caught six passes for 90 yards and a touchdown. Rhodes returned five kickoffs for 121 yards, rushed for 16 yards, and caught two passes for 17 yards.

Colts players would later publicly complain that the game officials did not properly call illegal contact, pass interference, and defensive holding penalties on the Patriots' defensive backs. This, and similar complaints made by other NFL teams, would prompt the NFL during the 2004 offseason to instruct all of the league's officials to strictly enforce these types of fouls.

This was the first postseason meeting between the Colts and Patriots.

NFC: Carolina Panthers 14, Philadelphia Eagles 3

Carolina's defense shut down the Eagles offense, only allowing a field goal and holding Donovan McNabb to just 10 of 22 completions for 100 yards. Rookie cornerback Ricky Manning intercepted McNabb three times, while the Panthers defense recorded a total of five sacks. McNabb also sustained a lower-rib injury early in the game but stayed in until the second half. Although Carolina's offense only scored 14 points, it was more than enough for the team to earn their first trip to the Super Bowl with a 14–3 win. For the Eagles, it was their third straight NFC Championship Game loss.

After a scoreless first quarter, the Panthers mounted the only long scoring drive of the game, advancing the ball 79 yards and scoring with Jake Delhomme's 24-yard touchdown pass to Muhsin Muhammad. The Eagles responded by driving 44 yards and scoring with a 41-yard field goal from David Akers. Philadelphia then forced a punt and drove to their own 44-yard line, but McNabb was intercepted by Manning and the score remained 7–3 at halftime.

The Eagles took the second half kickoff and drove to the Panthers 18-yard line before Manning ended the drive with his second interception. Then after a punt, Manning recorded his third interception and returned it 13 yards to the Eagles 37-yard line. Four plays later, DeShaun Foster's 1-yard touchdown run increased Carolina's lead to 14–3.

In the fourth quarter, the Eagles had one last chance to come back, driving 74 yards in 11 plays to the Panthers 11-yard line. But linebacker Dan Morgan picked off a pass from backup quarterback Koy Detmer in the end zone with 5:16 left. The next time Philadelphia got the ball back, they turned the ball over on downs and Carolina ran out the clock to win the game.

This was the first postseason meeting between the Panthers and Eagles.

Super Bowl XXXVIII: New England Patriots 32, Carolina Panthers 29

This was the first Super Bowl meeting between the Panthers and Patriots.

References

NFL.com scores for the 2003 playoffs (Last accessed January 9, 2006)

External links
2003–04 NFL playoffs at ESPN

National Football League playoffs
Playoffs
St. Louis Rams postseason